Michael Ruetz (born 4 April 1940 in Berlin, Germany) works as artist and author. He is a German photographer.

Early life and education

Ruetz was born in 1940 in Berlin, Germany. His ancestors were from Riga, where they worked as printers, journalists and publishers. After attending school in Bremen, Ruetz studied Sinology, with Japanology and Journalism as subsidiary subjects, in Freiburg, Munich and Berlin. Until 1969 he worked on a dissertation on the novel Nieh-Hai Hua by Tseng-P’u (1905). In 1975, Ruetz graduated as external student from the Folkwang Hochschule Essen.

Career

Ruetz was a member of the Stern editorial in Hamburg from 1969 to 1973. Since then he has been self-employed and works as a freelance author and photographer. Since 1981, Ruetz is a contract author for publishers Little, Brown & Co./New York Graphic Society, Boston, Massachusetts. In 1982, he became professor of Communication Design at the Braunschweig University of Art and taught Photography until 2005. Ruetz lived in Italy, Australia and the U.S. for 12 years. 
Michael Ruetz is the sole heir of German photographer  Heinz Hajek-Halke's artistic work and managed his estate from 1983 until 2020. He organised major retrospectives of Heinz Hajek-Halke in Centre Pompidou, Paris 2002, at Kunstbibliothek, Staatliche Museen zu Berlin in 2007, at Versicherungskammer Kulturstiftung in Munich 2008 and at Akademie der Künste, Berlin in 2012.
Ruetz is a member of the Deutsche Gesellschaft für Photographie (DGPh), the Gesellschaft Deutscher Lichtbildner (GDL)/Deutsche Foto Akademie and the Academy of Arts, Berlin. In May 2002 he was appointed member of the Ordre des Arts et Lettres by French Minister of the Arts, Jean-Jacques Aillagon.

Works 

Ruetz first became known through his photographs of the student protest movement in West Germany. His portraits of the APO (extra-parliamentary opposition), now part of German photographic history, were immediately bought up by major newspapers and magazines in Germany and abroad, including Time, Life, Der Spiegel and Stern. In 1968, Ruetz covered the invasion of Czechoslovakia by Soviet troops (Prague Spring) and reported for Stern on the military dictatorship in Greece, as on the World Festival of Youth and Students 1973 and the International Workers’ Day 1974 in East Berlin. He later accompanied François Mitterrand on his election campaign, visited Chile after the victory of Salvador Allende and reported on the war in Guinea-Bissau and on many other international events.
After spending several years in America and Australia, Ruetz began to concentrate increasingly on cultural-historical and documentary projects, such as the exploration of the "visual world" of such figures as Johann Wolfgang von Goethe and Theodor Fontane creating series like In Goethe's Footsteps, With Goethe in Switzerland, Me Too in Arcadia/Goethe's Italian Journeys, Fontane's Walks Through Mark Brandenburg. An extensive study of the phenomena of European Necropoles followed.
His works since the 1980s deal with the capability of visualizing time and transience. Projects like Second Sight, Timescape and The Perennial Eye, assembled under the main title Eye on Time, document the change of the world's surface during time. In contrast to the individual picture pairs of the Second Sight project, Timescape comprises photographic sequences made over many years. The project is still ongoing and currently consists of more than 300 series of different objects. The photographs already give a clear indication of how much the people, the places, the squares, the apartments, and even nature are in a state of change. What does not change, however, is the geographical vantage point of each photographic series.

Awards 

 Kodak Photobook Prize for Auf Goethes Spuren (In Goethe’s Footsteps), Necropolis, APO/Berlin 1966–1969 and Land der Griechen (Land of the Greeks).
 1979 Schönstes Buch der Schweiz for Mit Goethe in der Schweiz (With Goethe in Switzerland)
 1969 German Design Prize
 1979 Otto Steinert Prize
 1981 Villa Massimo Prize
 2002 Ordre des Arts et Lettres

Exhibitions

Solo exhibitions (selected) 
 1969 Berlin, Galerie Mikro
 1974 Hamburg, Kunsthalle, The World of Caspar David Friedrich
 1975 Hanover, Galerie Spectrum
 1975 Lissabon, German Institute
 1976 Berlin, Bielefeld, Göttingen, Hamburg, Copenhagen and Munich, Necropolis
 1977 Berlin, Landesbildstelle, Pictures from Germany 1968–1975
 1979 Zurich, Helmhaus, In Goethe’s Footsteps
 1980 Düsseldorf, Goethe-Museum, In Goethe’s Footsteps
 1981 Houston/Texas, Benteler Galleries
 1987 Carmel/California, Photography West Gallery
 1989–1995 Kiel, Harburg, Rendsburg, Itzehoe, Buxtehude, Lüneburg, Flensburg, Neumünster, Ahrensburg, Preetz, Rostock and Schwerin, Me too in Arcadia
 1992 Potsdam, Kulturhaus, Theodor Fontane
 1995 Berlin, Deutsches Historisches Museum, Eye on Time
 1996 Berlin, Willy Brandt Haus
 1996 Hamburg, Museum für Kunst und Gewerbe, Eye on Time
 1998 Berlin, Galerie Eva Poll, A Library for the Eye
 1998 Berlin, Willy Brandt Haus, Reviewing an Era
 1999 Greimharting, A Library for the Eye
 1999 Palermo, Goethe-Institut, Goethe in Arcadia, Et me in Italia
 2001 Kunsthaus Lempertz, Berlin, Cologne and Bruxelles, WindEye
 2001 Cologne, Galerie Priska Pasquer, Timescape, a Palimpsest and The Sixties in vintage prints
 2001 Kunsthalle Erfurt, WindEye, Timescape – 2 Picture Cycles
 2005 Academy of Arts, Berlin, Eye on Time
 2007 Berlin, Willy-Brandt-Haus, Eye on Eternity
 2008 Berlin, Academy of Arts, 1968. Die Unbequeme Zeit. Exhibition information
 2008 Barcelona, Goethe Institut Barcelona, 1968. Die Unbequeme Zeit. Exhibition information
 2008 Berlin, Deutsches Historisches Museum, Eye on Time. Exhibition information
 2009–2010 Helsinki, Goethe Institut Helsinki, 1968. Die Unbequeme Zeit
 2010 Madrid, Goethe Institut Madrid, 1968. Die Unbequeme Zeit
 2010 Tbilissi, Goethe Institut Tbilissi, 1968. Die Unbequeme Zeit
 2010 Berlin, Eye on Life – Die unbequeme Zeit, Johanna Breede, Berlin. Exhibition information
 2011 Potsdam, Kunstraum Potsdam, Sichtbare Zeit II. Exhibition information
 2014 Berlin, Willy-Brandt-Haus, Portugal im Jahre Null
 2015 Berlin, Galerie Pankow, Facing Time. Exhibition information
 2017 Boston, Goethe Institut Boston, Die Unbequeme Zeit . Exhibition information

Group exhibitions (selected) 
 1968 Prague
 1972 Kassel, Documenta V
 1973, 1979 Essen, Folkwang Museum
 1974, 1978 London, Institute of Contemporary Arts
 1975 Essen, Haus Industrieform
 1976 London, The Photographers’ Gallery
 1976 Vienna, Congress Amnesty International
 1977, 1980 Munich Stadtmuseum/Fotomuseum
 1979 Cologne, Galerie der DGPh
 1980, 1981 Hamburg, Kunsthaus/Kunstverein and PPS-Galerie
 1980, 1982 Washington, D.C., Sander Gallery
 1980 Baltimore, Maryland, The Maryland Institute
 1980 Berlin, Künstlerhaus Bethanien
 1980 Munich, Stadtmuseum/Fotomuseum
 1980 Kassel, Fotoforum
 1980 Wolfsburg, Kunstverein
 1981 Houston, Texas, Benteler Galleries und Rice University
 1982 Cologne, Benteler Galleries
 1982 New York, Photographic Art Dealers Convention
 1983 Hanover, Galerie Spectrum
 1985 Düsseldorf, Kunsthalle
 1985 Zurich, Kunsthaus
 1985 Rome, Deutsche Akademie/Villa Massimo
 1987 Darmstadt, Kunsthalle
 1995 Hanover, Kunstverein and Sprengel Museum
 1997 Bonn, Kunsthalle der Bundesrepublik Deutschland
 1998 Berlin, Haus am Waldsee, Die Römische Spur
 1998 Düsseldorf, Galerie Zimmer
 1998 Erfurt, Galerie Am Fischmarkt
 1998 Hamburg, Stern, Seeing the World
 1999 Berlin, Deutsches Historisches Museum, Bonn, Kunstmuseum and Galerie der Stadt Stuttgart, Seeing the World
 2000 Paris, Paris Photo, Galerie Priska Pasquer, The Perennial Eye
 2001 Berlin, Galerie Brusberg/Der Spiegel, The Sixties
 2001 Paris, Paris Photo, Galerie Priska Pasquer, Timescape
 2002 Berlin, Willy Brandt Haus, Willy Brandt
 2002 Berlin, Galerie Brusberg/Willy Brandt Haus, The Sixties
 2002 Leipzig, The Sixties
 2002 Paris, Paris Photo, Galerie Priska Pasquer, Massimo Passacaglia
 2003 Bonn, Friedrich-Ebert-Stiftung
 2003 Osnabrück, Kunsthalle Dominikanerkirche,
 2003 Halle, Galerie Kommode
 2003 Karlsruhe
 2003 Eisenach, Stadtschloss
 2003 Göttingen, Künstlerhaus
 2003 Lübeck, Kunsthaus
 2003 Prague, City Gallery and Berlin, Deutsches Historisches Museum, Von Körpern und anderen Dingen. Contemporary German Photography
 2003 Paris, Paris Photo, Galerie Priska Pasquer, Eye on Eternity
 2004 Moscow and Bochum, Von Körpern und anderen Dingen. Contemporary German Photography
 2013 Berlin, Willy-Brandt-Haus, Puro Pueblo. Chile 1971–73. Exhibition information
 2013 Berlin, Johanna Breede, Frauen / Women. Exhibition information
 2014 Berlin, Johanna Breede, Men / Männer. Exhibition information
 2015 Berlin, Johanna Breede, The Window – Das Fenster. Exhibition information
 2016 Berlin, Academy of Arts, DEMO:POLIS. Exhibition information
 2016 Berlin, Johanna Breede, Vis-à-Vis. Exhibition information
 2017 Berlin, Johanna Breede, Favorite Images / Lieblingsbilder. Exhibition information
 2018 Murnau, Kunststiftung Petra Benteler, Im Blauen Land. Exhibition information
 2021 Köln, Van der Grinten Galerie, Im Dialog mit Joseph Beuys. Exhibition information

References

External links 
 
 on the retrospective at Deutsches Historisches Museum, „Time Unveiled“, 1995–1996
 Galerie Priska Pasquer, Cologne

1940 births
Living people
Photographers from Berlin
German male writers
Folkwang University of the Arts alumni
Members of the Academy of Arts, Berlin